The Tacoosh River is a  river situated on the Upper Peninsula of Michigan in the United States. It flows into Lake Michigan at Little Bay de Noc.

References

 

Rivers of Michigan
Tributaries of Lake Michigan
Rivers of Delta County, Michigan